The Extraordinary and Plenipotentiary Ambassador of Peru to the Holy See is the official representative of the Republic of Peru to the Holy See. The Ambassador is also accredited to the Sovereign Military Order of Malta.

Both countries officially established relations on 1859 under Pius IX and have since maintained diplomatic relations.

List of representatives

Representatives (1852–1870)

Representatives (1870–1929)

Representatives since 1929

See also
List of ambassadors of Peru to Italy

References

Holy See
Peru